Lobbying Act can refer to several pieces of legislation governing the lobbying of government:

 Lobbying Act (Canada) - Canadian law regarding lobbying of Parliament
 Lobbying Disclosure Act of 1995 - US law regarding lobbying of the US Congress
 Transparency of Lobbying, Non-party Campaigning and Trade Union Administration Act 2014 - UK law regarding political and lobbying activities